The 6th Maya Awards was an awarding ceremony presented by the Maya Channel Magazine, giving recognition to the Thai entertainment industry in the fields of music, film, television and drama for their achievements in the year 2020.

The awards night was held at the CDC Crystal Grand Ballroom, Bangkok, Thailand on Tuesday, 20 October 2020. Voting period for certain categories ran from 1 May 2020 to 10 October 2020.

Nominees 
Nominations were announced on 30 April 2020. Winners are listed first and highlighted in bold:

Television networks and personalities

Television

Music

Special awards

References 

2020
Maya